The 1982 Avon Championships World Championship Series was the 10th season since the foundation of the Women's Tennis Association. It commenced on January 4, 1982, and concluded on December 19, 1982, after 36 events. The Avon Championships World Championship Series was the elite tour for professional women's tennis organised by the Women's Tennis Association (WTA). It was held in place of the WTA Tour from 1982 until 1987 and featured tournaments that had previously been part of the Toyota Series and the Avon Series. It included the four Grand Slam tournaments and a series of other events. ITF tournaments were not part of the tour, although they awarded points for the WTA World Ranking.

Schedule 
The table below shows the 1982 Avon Championships World Championship Series schedule.

Key

January

February

March

April

May

June

July

August

September

October

November

December

Rankings 

Below are the 1982 WTA year-end rankings (December 20, 1982) in singles competition:

See also 
 1982 Volvo Grand Prix
 Women's Tennis Association
 International Tennis Federation

References

External links 
 Official WTA Tour website

 
WTA Tour
1982 WTA Tour